71st Infantry may refer to:

 71st Infantry Regiment (Greece)
 71st Infantry Regiment (New York)
 Highland Light Infantry, the 71st Foot
 71st Infantry Division (France)
 71st Infantry Division (United States)

See also 
 71st Regiment (disambiguation)